Mike Lipe was a master guitar luthier, known for his custom built electric guitar company, Lipe Guitars U.S.A. He worked for over 35 years as a luthier, and has built guitars for many notable players including Brian May, Steve Vai, Joe Satriani, Michael Angelo Batio, and Carlos Santana. He ran a boutique guitar company called Lipe Guitars U.S.A. in Los Angeles, California.

Early years 

Mike Lipe began building guitars in the mid seventies while working at Killeen Music, a music store in Burbank, CA. Eight years later, Lipe left to work for guitar manufacturer Mighty Mite. In 1983 he started his own business and became L.A.'s original Guitar Doctor. After six years of building and customizing guitars for some of L.A.'s most respected musicians, Lipe's business was purchased by Ibanez in 1989. While with Ibanez, Lipe was chosen among many other expert luthiers to create a custom guitar shop on the West Coast, in which he was the master builder of electric guitars for several prominent guitarists such as Joe Satriani and Steve Vai. After leaving Ibanez, Mike went to Yamaha, where he worked for two years. Over the next several years, Lipe worked for several guitar manufacturers including Hofner and Fender. During this time, Mike Lipe created and customized guitars for many internationally renowned electric guitarists and bassists.

Lipe Guitars 
Owner and Master Luthier of "Lipe Guitars USA" - founded in 2000. Located in Los Angeles County, California.

References

External links
Mike Lipe Interview - NAMM Oral History Library (2016)

Living people
American luthiers
Businesspeople from Los Angeles
1948 births